Filippo Melegoni (born 18 February 1999) is an Italian professional footballer who plays as a midfielder for Belgian First Division A club Standard Liège, on loan from Genoa.

Club career

Early career
Melegoni was born in Bergamo, Italy, and began his career at local Serie A side Atalanta. A midfielder, he states that his playing style is modelled on his childhood idols Zinedine Zidane and David Beckham.

Atalanta
Melegoni played at various age levels of the Atalanta youth sector, including making 24 appearances for the under-17 side, scoring six goals. He eventually began to play in the full Primavera side in 2016, and established himself as a mainstay in the centre of midfield. After being named on the Atalanta first-team bench for several games, Melegoni was placed in the starting line-up for the match against Sampdoria on 22 January 2017. He played the first half before being replaced at the interval, in an eventual 1–0 win.

Loan to Pescara
On 11 August 2018, Melegoni joined Serie B club Pescara on loan until 30 June 2019. On 23 July 2019, the loan was renewed for an additional year.

Loan to Genoa
On 16 September 2020, Melegoni joined Genoa on a two-year loan deal with a conditional obligation to buy.

International career
Melegoni has been capped by Italy at under-15, under-16, under-17 levels, and is a current member of the under-19 side. His first international call-up came in 2014 for a friendly match against Belgium. He progressed quickly up to the under-17 team, where he was eventually made captain. He also scored his first international goal whilst playing for Bruno Tedino's side, in a 3–1 loss against the Netherlands, and went on to make 29 appearances in total. He received his first call-up to the under-19 side, bypassing under-18 level, by Roberto Baronio for the match against Croatia. His first goal for the under-19 team came in his second game; a 2–1 loss against the Czech Republic.

On 3 September 2020, he made his debut with the Italy U21 side, scoring Italy's second goal in a 2–1 friendly home win against Slovenia.

Honours
Italy U19
UEFA European Under-19 Championship runner-up: 2018

References

1999 births
Living people
Footballers from Bergamo
Association football midfielders
Italian footballers
Italy under-21 international footballers
Italy youth international footballers
Atalanta B.C. players
Delfino Pescara 1936 players
Genoa C.F.C. players
Serie A players
Serie B players